Basha Bakri (born 1927) is a Sudanese former sports shooter. He competed in the 300 metre rifle, three positions event at the 1960 Summer Olympics.

References

External links

1927 births
Possibly living people
Sudanese male sport shooters
Olympic shooters of Sudan
Shooters at the 1960 Summer Olympics